Fort Salonga, also known as NYSDHP Unique Site No. A103-08-0036, is an archeological site in the vicinity of Fort Salonga, New York that was listed on the National Register of Historic Places in 1982.

It is the site of the Revolutionary War British Fort Salonga, or Fort Slongo, (named after one of the fort's architects – George Slongo) once located near the border of Huntington Township and The Town of Smithtown, overlooking the Long Island Sound.

In an October 1781 skirmish between the British and Americans at the fort, Elijah Churchill, a soldier for the Continental Army, was wounded.  He personally received a Badge of Military Merit from George Washington for his actions.  The Badge became the Purple Heart and he is credited with being the first to receive the award.

References

Geography of Suffolk County, New York
Salonga
Salonga
Salonga
Salonga
National Register of Historic Places in Suffolk County, New York
American Revolution on the National Register of Historic Places
Archaeological sites in New York (state)
1776 establishments in New York (state)